Akbulut is a village in the Eldivan District of Çankırı Province in Turkey. Its population is 32 (2021).

References

Villages in Eldivan District